A statue of Tony DeMarco by Harry Weber is installed in Boston's North End, in the U.S. state of Massachusetts. DeMarco attended the bronze sculpture's dedication ceremony in 2012.

See also

 2012 in art

References

2012 establishments in Massachusetts
2012 sculptures
Bronze sculptures in Massachusetts
Monuments and memorials in Boston
North End, Boston
Outdoor sculptures in Boston
Sculptures of men in Massachusetts
Sculptures of sports
Statues in Boston